Gerascophobia is an abnormal or incessant fear of growing older or ageing (senescence).

Background
Gerascophobia is a clinical phobia generally classified under specific phobias or fears of a single specific panic trigger. Gerascophobia may be based on anxieties of being left alone without resources and incapable of caring for oneself due to age-caused disability.

Symptoms 
Some sufferers seek plastic surgery to make them look more youthful, while the main concern of others is a fear of internal, biological long-term damage caused by the aging process.

Etymology 

The term gerascophobia comes from the Greek γηράσκω, gerasko, "I grow old" and φόβος, phobos, "fear". Some authors refer to it as gerontophobia, although this may also refer to the fear of the elderly due to memento mori.

See also 
 Existential crisis
 Fountain of Youth
 List of phobias
 Midlife crisis
 Nihilism
 Thanatophobia

References

Phobias
Ageing
Old age